The 1967 Ballon d'Or, given to the best football player in Europe as judged by a panel of sports journalists from UEFA member countries, was awarded to Flórián Albert.

Rankings

Source: France Football

External links
 France Football Official Ballon d'Or page

1967
1967–68 in European football